Lee Ji-young (born April 19, 1986), known as Lee Ji, is a South Korean actress, singer and pianist. She is a former member of South Korean girl group Gangkiz.

Biography
Hae-in was born as Lee Ji-young on April 19, 1986, in Masan, South Gyeongsang Province, South Korea. She has studied at Masan Gapo High School and Seoul Arts National University.

Music career

Hae-in debuted as a member of the girl group Gangkiz in 2012; their group released the mini album We Became Gang and repackaged mini album Mama in the same year. A year later, she left the group and became an actress.

Since September 2020, Hae-in started to post piano-playing videos on YouTube.

Discography

Filmography

Film

Television series

Music video

Theater

References

External links
 
 
 

1986 births
Living people
MBK Entertainment artists
South Korean female idols
South Korean women pop singers
K-pop singers
South Korean television actresses
21st-century South Korean singers
21st-century South Korean women singers
South Korean women pianists
20th-century women pianists
21st-century women pianists